OP Mahendra is an Indian social activist and politician belonging to the Bhartiya Janata Party and currently the State President BJP SC Morcha of the party. He was a member of legislative assembly from the Kesrisinghpur constituency of Rajasthan. He is also State President of Akhil Bhartiya Khatik Samaj.

External links 
 Dr. OP Mahendra on twitter

References

1957 births
Living people
People from Sri Ganganagar district
Rajasthan MLAs 2003–2008
Bharatiya Janata Party politicians from Rajasthan